Patagonia has been used as the name for a ship in the Argentine Navy three times:

 , a protected cruiser
 , a transport ship
 , a replenishment oiler

Argentine Navy ship names